RingGo is a pay by phone parking service, based in the UK. The RingGo brand was acquired by Moovel Group, jointly owned by BMW Group and Daimler AG, becoming a sister of Share Now and Free Now.

Technology

To use the service, customers call a dedicated telephone number or use the mobile app, specifying the location of the parking space.

Implementations
The first major implementation (from June 2006) was for First Great Western at 60 railway stations.  It processes over 2 million phone parking transactions a month and over 6 million individual UK motorists have used the service.

The system has been adopted by train operating companies including Network Rail, Chiltern Railways, South Western Railway, Govia Thameslink Railway, Greater Anglia, c2c, TransPennine Express, KeolisAmey Wales and London North Eastern Railway.  The service has also been offered in NCP operated and managed car parks since March 2010.

The system is also used by local authorities for on-street parking and public car parks. On 1 October 2009, Richmond Council introduced variable parking charges which were linked to the carbon dioxide emissions of vehicles parking there (carbon metered parking). Payment of the service was either via RingGo or by a Richmond smart card, which could be used in the machine.

References

External links
 RingGo website

Mobile technology
Parking companies